The white lighter curse or white lighter myth is an urban legend based on the 27 Club in which it is claimed several musicians and artists died while in possession of a white disposable cigarette lighter, leading such items to become associated with bad fortune. The myth is primarily based on the deaths of Jimi Hendrix, Janis Joplin, Jim Morrison, and Kurt Cobain. The myth has been integrated with cannabis culture. 

In 2017, Snopes.com published an article discrediting the theory, noting that Bic did not begin producing white disposable lighters until several years after the deaths of members of the 27 Club (including Hendrix, Joplin, and Morrison) and that disposable lighters produced by other companies were not widely available at that time.

References

Cannabis culture
Urban legends
Lighters (firelighting)